The Eurofly FB5 Star Light is a single engine kit built Italian ultralight, seating two side by side. It first flew in the late 2000s.

Design and development

The latest in Eurofly's range of light aircraft, the Star Light is a conventionally laid out, single engine, low wing monoplane seating two side by side.  It is a kit built ultralight with a fabric covered metal frame, steel in the cockpit area and with alloy fuselage longerons.  The wings have constant chord and square tips; inboard flaps are fitted.  The fuselage is flat sided, though with a deep rounded decking which merges into the rear of the large, one piece cockpit canopy.  This decking tapers towards the tail where the tailplane, with swept leading edges and straight tips and carrying elevators with  straight trailing edges, is mounted on the top of the fuselage. The fin has a similar shape to the tailplane, though the rudder hinge and trailing edge are also slightly swept.  The rudder extends to the bottom of the fuselage, moving in a cut-out between the elevators.

The Star Light can be powered by one of two variants of the Rotax 912 flat four piston engines: either the 60 kW (80 hp) UL or the 73.5 kW (99 hp) ULS. It has a fixed tricycle undercarriage, with mainwheels spring mounted from the fuselage and a castoring nosewheel. The landing gear is fabricated from Zicral alloy bars to provide adequate suspension. Wheel fairings may be fitted.

Operational history

At least 12 Star Lights were operational in Italy by mid-2010.  Another has been on the Spanish register since early 2009.

Specifications (FB5 Star Light)

References

External links

Star Light
2000s Italian sport aircraft